Caspar Wistar Hodge may refer to:

 Caspar Wistar Hodge, Sr. (1830–1891)
 Caspar Wistar Hodge, Jr. (1870–1937)